The first instances of organized women's ice hockey in Canada date back to the 1890s when it was played at the university level. The Women's Hockey Association claims that the city of Ottawa, Ontario hosted the first game in 1891. In 1920, Lady Meredith, an avid sportswoman and wife of Sir Vincent Meredith of Montreal donated the Lady Meredith Cup
to the Quebec Ladies' Hockey Association, said to be the first women's ice hockey trophy created for a competition in Canada. At the time women competed in ankle-length skirts.

In February 1921, a women's North American championship series was played in conjunction with the Pacific Coast Hockey Association. The Vancouver Amazons from the 1920s became one of the first professional teams. They were the first women's hockey team from Vancouver to participate in the invitational women's hockey tournament sponsored by the Banff Winter Carnival. On December 16, 1922, a meeting was held to announce the formation of the Ladies Ontario Hockey Association. The Dominion Women's Amateur Hockey Association was founded in winter 1933. Lady Bessborough, the wife of Governor General of Canada Lord Bessborough donated a championship trophy.

In 1978, Cookie Cartwright organized the Ontario Women's Hockey Association to generate interest in women's ice hockey. Fran Rider became the executive director. Cartwright solicited help from several experienced hockey people including Rhonda Leeman Taylor, Bev Mallory, Carl Noble, and later on, Frank Champion Demers. Rhonda Leeman Taylor became the first Development Coordinator for the women's game in the province. Coaches were quoted in the Toronto Star that Rhonda may bring the women's game into respectability.

The Abby Hoffman Cup was introduced in 1982 at the first Canadian National Women's Hockey Championship known as the "Shopper's Drug Mart Women's Nationals". In 1982, the first Esso Women's Nationals occurred in Brantford, Ontario, Canada under the guidance of Rhonda Leeman Taylor, who after went on to become the first woman to sit on Hockey Canada's board of directors. The final saw Alberta and Ontario face-off, with attendance of approximately 1,600 fans.

Leeman Taylor was the first individual to take women's hockey into the Corporate Board Room of Canada. For the first Nationals she was able to seek National Sponsorship from Shoppers Drug Mart and Air Canada. Also in 1982, she lobbied several Provinces to eliminate intentional checking from the women's game. All Provinces voted for the rule change except for one province. In addition, she founded and directed the Female Council, a subsect of the Canadian Amateur Hockey Association, representing female hockey in Canada.

In April 1987, Toronto, Ontario hosted the first ever Women's World Championship, though the tournament was not recognized by the International Ice Hockey Federation. The Ontario Women's Hockey Association hosted the tournament. During the tournament, representatives from participating nations met to establish a strategy to lobby the International Ice Hockey Federation (IIHF) for the creation of a Women's World Championship. The first IIHF-sanctioned tournament was held in Ottawa, Ontario in 1990. Women's hockey was included in the Olympics for the first time in 1998.

Early history

Lord Stanley of Preston's daughter, Lady Isobel Stanley, was a pioneer in the women's game and was one of the first females to be photographed using puck and stick (around 1890) on the natural ice rink at Rideau Hall in Ottawa, Ontario, Canada. Stanley, Canada's sixth Governor General, provided the ice for women's hockey games, transforming a large lawn on the grounds of Rideau Hall into a rink. Better known for his contribution of the challenge trophy later referred to as the Stanley Cup, Lord Stanley played a significant role in the development and growth of Canadian women's hockey. There have been disputes over where the first women's ice hockey game was played in Canada. The Women's Hockey Association claims that the city of Ottawa, Ontario hosted the first game in 1891. On February 11, 1891, one of the earliest newspaper accounts of a seven-a-side game between women appeared in the Ottawa Citizen. 

In the 1890s, women's ice hockey was introduced at the university level. McGill University's women's hockey team debuted in 1894. The University of Toronto and Queen's University in Kingston, Ontario were also some of the earliest Canadian universities to field women's ice hockey teams. Queen's would later discontinue its women's teams.

On March 8, 1899, an account appeared in the Ottawa Evening Journal newspaper of a game played between two women's teams of four per side at the Rideau Skating Rink in Ottawa. From 1915 to 1918 Albertine Lapensée played for the Cornwall Nationals. She is often considered Canada's first female hockey "superstar". In 1920, Lady Isobel Brenda (Allan) Meredith of Montreal donated the 'Lady Meredith Cup', the first ice hockey trophy in Canada to be competed for between women in ankle-length skirts. Lady Meredith (the wife of Sir Vincent Meredith) was the first cousin of Sir H. Montagu Allan who had donated the Allan Cup for men's amateur ice hockey in 1908. In the 1910s, women's ice hockey is known to have been played in Victoria, British Columbia.

Elizabeth Graham would play ice hockey for Queen's University and is credited as being the first goaltender ever to wear a mask for protection. She used the mask in 1927, and the use of the mask was in the Montreal Daily Star. She actually wore a fencing mask and the speculation is that she had used the mask as a means of protecting dental work that had been recently performed.

Abigail "Abby" Hoffman, gold medallist in the 880 yard event at the 1966 Commonwealth Games, first made a name for herself in ice hockey. She cut her hair short and pretended to be a boy in order to play with the St. Catharines Teepees, in a boys league. Once it was discovered that Hoffman was masquerading as a boy, the story made headlines around the world. An Ontario Supreme Court decision barred her from participating, although her parents challenged the league's "boys only" rule, but the league's policy was upheld by the provincial high court. In later years, Hoffman would help organize a national women's hockey championship (with representation from each province).

During the 1960s, Cookie Cartwright and a group of dedicated students revived the women's ice hockey program at Queen's University. Cartwright and the Golden Gaels would go on to capture the first women's university championship.

The women's game in Canada has been governed by the men's hockey system, except for Ontario which is governed by a separate women's hockey association. The Ontario Women's Hockey Association (OWHA) formed in 1975 and, though it was founded on the principles of collegialism (a collective volunteerism), it has shifted toward a professional mandate in more recent years.

The province of Ontario has seen growth in the number of women participating in hockey. In 2003, there were 31,122 hockey players in female leagues in the province of Ontario. These players were part of 2,060 teams. In 1993, Ontario had 7,848 girls registered on 557 teams.

PCHA Tournament
As early as January 1916, Frank Patrick and Lester Patrick talked of the formation of a women's league to complement the Pacific Coast Hockey Association. The proposal included teams from Vancouver, Victoria, Portland and Seattle. The proposed league was never formed.

In early January 1921, a team from Victoria, referred to in the Victoria Colonist as the Victoria and Island Athletic Association ladies team defeated a team from the University of British Columbia. This was the first reported occurrence of women's ice hockey in Victoria since 1914. In February 1921, Frank Patrick announced a women's international championship series that would be played in conjunction with the Pacific Coast Hockey Association. The three teams that competed were the Vancouver Amazons, Victoria Kewpies, and Seattle Vamps. On February 21, 1921, the Seattle Vamps competed against the Vancouver Amazons in Vancouver, and were vanquished by a 5–0 score. Two days later, the Vamps played against a team from the University of British Columbia and won the game. Jerry Reed scored three goals (a hat trick) in the game for the Vamps. In both games, the Vancouver media referred to the Seattle team as the Seattle Sweeties. The Amazons would travel to Seattle and defeat them again. On March 2, 1921, the Vamps were defeated by the Kewpies 1–0 in Seattle. In the rematch on March 12, the Vamps travelled to Victoria. The result was a 1–1 tie, and Jerry Reed scored the goal for Seattle. The goaltender for the Vamps was Mildren Terran. After the 1921 season, the Vamps and the Kewpies ceased operations.

Early rules

At first, referees in the women's game were male. When women fell to the ice, the male referee was expected to help them get back on their feet. Until 1914, women participating in hockey in Western Canada were expected to wear long skirts.

Western Canadian history
Reporters in Western Canada would refer to women not as hockey players but as fair manipulators of the twisted hickory.

Alberta

The first mention of a women's ice hockey game occurred in Medicine Hat in 1897. Two years later, the Edmonton Ladies Hockey Team was the first Canadian women's hockey team to endorse a commercial product. In an 1899 team photo, the Ladies Club is pictured lacing up Starr Acme Club skates. In the winter of 1937, intergender matches were contested in Alberta. A ladies club from Nanton, Alberta was formed and they defeated a local men's club by a 3–2 score.

In High River, Alberta, a high school girls team was formed. The team played a boys peewee team, also from High River, and this game was won by the boys team.

The Edmonton Rustlers were winners of the 1933 Alpine Cup, and defeated the Preston Rivulettes to become National Champions. It was one of the few times that the Rivulettes ever lost a game as Hazel Case scored the game-winning goal and the Rustlers prevailed by a 3–2 score. In 1934, the Rivulettes were slated to play the Rustlers in a rematch for the national championship, but the Rivulettes were unable to raise the $1800 necessary. By default, the Rustlers were champions.

British Columbia
Sandor holds the recognition of having the first women's hockey team in the province. The 1900 Rossland Winter Carnival added women's hockey as an event. After 1900, the Rossland Winter Carnival was recognized as hosting the Provincial women's hockey championships. In 1911, the Rossland Carnival final between Rossland and a team from Grand Forks, BC was hailed as the women's championship of the world.

Calgary

Calgary's roots in women's hockey date back to 1908. A Swastika skating club was formed in 1909 (at the time, the swastika was considered a sign of good fortune), and formations of teams in the Calgary Collegiate Institute and Mount Royal College provided women with many opportunities to participate. Calgary's first city team was the Calgary Crescents. The Crescents played teams from Red Deer, Okotoks, Canmore, Banff, and Medicine Hat.

At the 1917 Banff Winter Carnival, the Crescents qualified for the championship game but were defeated by the newly formed Calgary Regents. As Banff carnival champions, the Regents were given the Bernard-Harvey Trophy, which was introduced in the 1917 championship in an attempt to increase the status of the women's competition. It is unclear when the Bernard-Harvey Trophy was later replaced, however, financial accounts of the Alpine Club of Canada indicate that the club paid for a "Carnival Cup" in 1920. Newspaper accounts of what became known as the Alpine Cup did not appear until the winter carnival of 1921. The Crescents would play their final game at the 1918 Banff Carnival and would defeat the Regents. The defeat of the Regents would allow the Edmonton Monarchs to win the tournament.

In 1919, the Calgary Patricias were formed but they were never able to usurp the Calgary Regents as a better team. The Regents would win the Banff Winter Carnival tournament in 1919, 1920 and 1921. In addition, the Regents would go undefeated for four years. In February 1921, the wrote to Canadian Amateur Hockey Association president H. J. Sterling seeking recognition and approval to enter tournaments. He was sympathetic to the cause, but not approval was given and promised to discuss it with other ladies' clubs including Winnipeg and Ottawa. In 1924, the Regents would dissolve and form a new team with some members of the Calgary Byngs Ladies club. The newly formed team was known as the Calgary Holliles, and they actually lost their first game, a 2–0 defeat at the hands of the Calgary Patricias. The Hollies would win four Banff tournaments and be awarded the Alpine Cup.

In mid January 1921, the city of Calgary introduced its own winter carnival to compete with the Banff Winter Carnival. A women's ice hockey game was featured. The Calgary Regents defeated a team from Fernie.

During the 1936–37 season, the Calgary Avenue Grills (named after their sponsor, the Avenue Grill restaurant) were the provincial champions of Alberta. They were scheduled to play the Preston Rivulettes in March 1937 at Maple Leaf Gardens but were prevented to. The Dominion Women's Amateur Hockey Association intervened and ask that the Avenue Grills ladies team join the DWAHA. When the Avenue Grills refused to, a ladies team from Winnipeg was chosen to play the Rivulettes.

Eastern Canadian history
The Eastern Ladies Hockey League, which played their first match on December 13, 1915, were also known as La ligue du hockey des dames de Montréal.

The fastest ice hockey hat trick scored by a woman was done in Canada. The hat trick was scored in 35 seconds. This was accomplished in Canada by Melissa Horvat. At the time, she played for the Burlington 1 Bantams. Said hat trick was scored against Stoney Creek in Burlington, Ontario, on March 4, 2006

Maritimes
With the involvement of future Olympian Stacy Wilson, various women at Acadia University formed a women's hockey team in 1984. There was no varsity hockey team at the university so the team was a club team. The team wore used Acadia varsity men's hockey sweaters, and raised funds to play in a few tournaments. Wilson and her teammates were part of two Nova Scotia provincial championships. In addition, the Acadia club team represented Nova Scotia at the Women's National Championship in 1986 and 1987.

After Wilson graduated from Acadia University in 1987, she began to play senior women's hockey with the Moncton Blades (later known as the Maritime Blades). New Brunswick did not have a senior women's hockey league, therefore, the Blades were forced to arrange competitive games against men's minor hockey teams and men's old-timer teams. In order to play competitive hockey against other women, the Blades had to travel to Quebec. From 1988 to 1998, the Blades represented New Brunswick at the Women's National Hockey Championship. A member of the women's Team Canada hockey team since the first world championship in 1990, Wilson was also instrumental in launching, with the support of the Canadian Hockey Association (CHA), the first female hockey school in 1995.

Teams

Preston Rivulettes
The Rivulettes were inducted into the Cambridge Sports Hall of Fame in 1996. Although there is no clear origin, speculation is that an incident occurred in 1930 at Lowther St. Arena. The Preston Rivulettes girls softball team were pondering their future and a member of the team suggested hockey. The story is that an onlooker scoffed at the idea and challenged them. The first nine members of the team were:
Hilda Ranscombe (top-scoring right winger) 
Nellie Ranscombe (goalie) 
Marm and Helen Schmuck
Marg Gabbitass
Myrtle Parr
Toddy Webb
Pat Marriott
Helen Sault.
The Rivulettes played teams from Ontario cities such as Toronto, Kitchener, Stratford, London, Hamilton, Guelph and Port Dover. Over the years, other players represented the Rivulettes team. These included: Violet Hall, Sheila Lahey, Gladys Hawkins, Norma Hipel, Ruth Dargel, Elvas Williams, Fay Hilborn, Winnie Makcrow and Eleanor Fairgrieves, Midge Robertson and Marie Bielstein.

Between 1930 and 1940, the team played an estimated 350 games. They lost only two and tied three. For the entire decade of the 1930s, the Rivulettes were the winners of the Bobby Rosenfeld Trophy. The trophy was given to the Ontario champions. In addition, the Rivulettes were six-time winners of the Eastern Canadian championship and the Elmer Doust Cup (the honour for winning the Eastern Canadian championship). The team also won the Lady Bessborough Trophy (given to Canadian Champions) six times.

The Rivulettes were invited to play games in 1939 in Europe, but were unable due to the start of World War II. In 1963, the club was inducted into the Canadian Hockey Hall of Fame.

Rossland Ladies hockey team
The 1900 Carnival would see the debut of the Rossland Ladies Hockey Team (women could join the team for fifty cents, while men would be given an honorary membership for the same fee). Rossland played a ladies team from Nelson and won the game by a score of 4–0. One of Rossland's most notable players was Eva Blackman. She would play numerous positions over the year including goaltender. At the 1905 Carnival, no one would challenge Rossland, so the team split into two teams and played each other. The teams were known as the Reds and the Blues. Rossland's biggest upset came in 1917 when the club were defeated a ladies team from Grand Forks for the West Kootenay Championship.

Vancouver Amazons

The Vancouver Amazons were a women's hockey team from the 1920s. They were the first women's hockey team from Vancouver to participate in the invitational women's hockey tournament sponsored by the Banff Winter Carnival. The Amazons competed in 1921. The Amazons qualified for the final that year but were defeated. The team was owned by Frank Patrick, who also owned the Vancouver Millionaires. Patrick would organize a tournament featuring the Amazons, the Seattle Vamps and the Victoria Kewpies. The Amazons went undefeated in the tournament and
did not allow a goal. The Amazons were West Coast Women's champions. As the tournament featured a team from the United States, many consider this the first ever
international women's hockey competition. At the Banff tournament in 1922, Elizabeth Hinds, became the first woman from British Columbia to score a hat trick in a game Phebe Senkler was captain of the Amazons and her sister Norah played on defence. The forwards were Kathleen Carson and Nan Griffith, while the goaltender was Amelia Voitkevic. The bench featured Lorraine Cannon and Mayme Leahy.

The Amazons qualified for the 1922 final and played the Calgary Regents. In the third period, the Amazons were down 1–0, and Kathleen Carson tied the game. Carson would score the game-winning goal in overtime and were awarded the Alpine Cup.

Associations

LOHA
On December 16, 1922, a meeting was held to announce the Ladies Ontario Hockey Association was formed. The organization was structured similarly to the Ontario Women's Softball Association in which women would run the organization but men served in an advisory capacity. During the December 16 meeting, Frank McEwen, president of the Toronto Hockey League, presided over the meeting. Members from ladies clubs in London, Ontario and St. Thomas, Ontario were present. A letter from the Ottawa Alerts ladies club was presented, indicating their interest to join.

In 1923, Janet Allen was the first female to be elected LOHA president. In autumn of 1923, the LOHA suffered a setback when the Canadian Amateur Hockey Association held a meeting in Port Arthur. The Association voted not to give women official recognition as hockey players.
In 1927, LOHA president Janet Allen, and LOHA treasurer Bobbie Rosenfeld attended the 38th meeting of the Ontario Hockey Association and asked the OHA to help endorse the league. In the process, they announced that if the OHA would help boost its membership, the LOHA would create a provincial championship for its member teams.

The Preston Rivulettes would join the LOHA in 1931. Although their early success would promote women's hockey, by 1938, their later success would prove to be an organization challenge to the LOHA governing body. From 1931 to 1935, the Rivulettes were undefeated and won five consecutive provincial championships.

Many ladies teams in Ontario did not want to join the LOHA because they felt they had no chance of winning. The Rivulettes success caused the number of member teams to decrease. The decision was for the LOHA to create an A League and a B League. The B League would include first year teams, and teams that were not at a high skill level. LOHA president Bobbie Rosenfeld found it to be the only way to increase the number of member teams.

In 1939, new LOHA president Roxy Atkins appealed to past OHA president Dudley to promote the LOHA B League. Atkins wanted Dudley to help increase membership by encouraging ladies teams from Northwestern and Western Ontario to join. Despite the appeal, by 1941, the LOHA was dissolved and it amalgamated with the Ontario branch of the Women's Amateur Athletic Federation.

Dominion Women's Amateur Hockey Association
The Dominion Women's Amateur Hockey Association (DWAHA) was founded in winter 1933. Lady Bessborough, the wife of Governor General of Canada Lord Bessborough donated a championship trophy. The trophy would be contested between the Edmonton Rustlers and the Preston Rivulettes. Presidents of the DWAHA were Myrtle Cook-McGowan before 1937, Bobbie Rosenfeld from 1937 to 1939, and Mary Dunn in 1940.

The DWAHA sought to grow its membership to include all provinces in Canada, and to use the national playoffs for the Lady Bessborough Trophy to raise funds and increase the profile of women's hockey in Canada. The DWAHA wanted to showcase its talents by sending an all-star team to Europe to play against teams in France and England; and to petition the Canadian Olympic Committee and the International Olympic Committee for women's hockey to be a demonstration sport at the 1940 Winter Olympics.

Professional

Canadian Women's Hockey League
The Canadian Women's Hockey League (CWHL), preceded by the NWHL and COWHL was formed in 2007. Teams competed for the Clarkson Cup, donated by former Canadian Governor General Adrienne Clarkson. From 2007 to 2017, the players did not earn a salary, but their travel time, uniforms, equipment and coaches were covered by the league. Jayna Hefford became the first player in the CWHL to record 100 career points. She recorded the record-setting point milestone on January 17, 2009, in a win over the Montreal Stars. On August 12, 2010, the league hosted its first draft, following a reorganization of the league, held at the Hockey Hall of Fame in Toronto. The first overall selection was former Ohio State hockey player and Olympic gold medalist Tessa Bonhomme.

A new National Women's Hockey League launched in 2015 in the United States as the first women's league to pay a salary. In the 2017–18 and 2018–19 seasons, the CWHL began paying a small stipend to the players as well following an expansion of the league with two Chinese teams. In 2019, the CWHL ceased operations citing unsustainable business operations.

National Women's Hockey League
The National Women's Hockey League (NWHL), based in the United States, began in 2015 as the first professional women's hockey league to pay a base salary for all players. Funding for the new league comes from sponsorship and donations, with each team initially receiving approximately $270,000 as a salary cap. The salary attracted some Canadian players such as Kelly Babstock. The league ran into financial issues during its second season leading to the league cutting salaries by half. After the dissolution of the CWHL in 2019, the NWHL announced its intentions of placing expansion teams in Toronto and Montreal. The Toronto Six became the first Canadian expansion team, joining the league for the 2020–21 season.

Players
Women's Ice Hockey in Canada has 85 624 players in 2010.  Some of the more well known players are:
Shirley Cameron was a founding member of the Edmonton Chimos in 1972. She played in the first IIHF Women's World Championships (played in 1990). Cameron competed in 16 Canadian championships with the Chimos. After 1992, she became a coach. Two of Alberta's women's hockey teams, the Chimos and the Calgary Oval X-Treme play a ten-game series, and the winner gets a trophy named in Cameron's honour: the Cameron Cup.
 Fran Rider began playing hockey in 1967 with the Brampton Canadettes. Eight years later, the Ontario Women's Hockey Association was formed and Fran Rider became the executive director. The Association was formed to generate interest in women's hockey. An award is named after her and is given to the silver medal-winning team at the Canadian Senior Women's National Championships. The award is known as the Fran Rider Cup. Of note, Rider was the first female recipient of the Canadian Amateur Hockey Association's Award of Merit. The Ontario Hockey Association's Minor Hockey Service Award was given to Fran, and she was the first woman to claim that honour. Other awards included the OHA's Gold Stick Award, the Ontario Ministry of Culture and Citizenship's Contribution to Sport Award and membership in the Mississauga Sports Hall of Fame.
 Hilda Ranscombe played hockey in the Great Depression. She was considered the equivalent of many men. Besides hockey, she played baseball for a team called the Preston Rivulettes, that would later become a hockey team of that same name. Before her death, Ranscombe donated all her equipment to the Hockey Hall of Fame in Toronto.

Figures

Sylvia Romanelli
In 1986, Sylvia Romanelli became the  first female president  of a boys minor hockey association. Sylvia Romanelli had been the manager of a boys minor hockey team for 4 years prior to being nominated and voted in as president of the Woodbridge minor
hockey association. Sylvia was the first to introduce participant trophies in the organization in 1974. She was also the first to have regular scheduled exhibition games with GTHL teams. Sylvia was  fully responsible for bringing the first OMHA team to Europe for a 2-week tour of 4 countries. She managed her boys 1986 hockey team to an all Ontario championship.

Samantha Holmes
Samantha Holmes played for the Canadian National women's team from 2000 to 2005. Her part in women's hockey history was related to an activist role. As a child she attended the 1988 Winter Games in Calgary. Upon her arrival, she was disappointed to learn that there would not be a women's hockey tournament. After the games she began a letter writing campaign to get women involved in women's ice hockey. She began by writing a letter to her local newspaper. She proceeded by writing to Mississauga mayor Hazel McCallion, Canadian Prime Minister Brian Mulroney, and IOC President Juan Antonio Samaranch. 

She moved to Calgary in June 2002 and played hockey for the Calgary Oval X-Treme. She competed in two international tournaments for her country, but never participated in the Olympics. After she left the Oval X-Treme, she formed her own team. Her team was the Strathmore Rockies and they joined the Western Women's Hockey League. The idea stemmed from the fact that there were many elite hockey players in Calgary, but not all of them had the opportunity to play for the Oval X-Treme. Holmes also handled the day-to-day tasks of running the Strathmore team. Part of her accomplishments included player scouting, sponsorship and marketing campaigns to operate the team. She is also captain of the Rockies and a graduate of the University of New Hampshire. Holmes runs local skills clinics in Calgary for young women's players.

Hazel McCallion

Hazel McCallion was well known in Canada for her love of hockey. She played for a professional women's team while attending school in Montreal. McCallion started playing hockey in the late 1920s in the town of Port Daniel, Quebec. She played with her two sisters and was a forward on their team. McCallion later played hockey for $5 a game in the city of Montreal. The team was sponsored by Kik Cola and it was a three team women's league. At one time, she was a board member of the Ontario Women's Hockey League, and was instrumental in getting the Hershey Centre built for the city of Mississauga. McCallion provided assistance for Don Cherry's group to bring an Ontario Hockey League franchise to the city in 1998, and she was instrumental in bringing the IIHF Women's World Hockey Championships to the city in 2000. McCallion also sits on the OWHA Board of Regents.

Maureen McTeer
Maureen McTeer is the wife of former Canadian prime minister Joe Clark. She was raised in Ottawa, to John and Bea McTeer. McTeer's father taught her and her older sister, Colleen, to play hockey, resulting in McTeer's childhood dream of playing in the NHL. Her commitment to feminism and eagerness to combat stereotypes was born when her father reminded her that girls did not play in the NHL.

In 1982, McTeer and athlete Abby Hoffman were among the organizers of the Esso Women's Nationals championship tournament for women's ice hockey. One of the tournament's trophies, the Maureen McTeer Trophy, is named for her. It is awarded to the team that finishes in third place at the Esso Nationals.

Justine Blainey
In 1981, Justine Blainey won a spot on a Metro Toronto Hockey League Team (MTHL) but was denied the chance to play. This denial was attributed to MTHL regulations that did not permit women in the league. Blainey addressed a complaint to the Human Rights Commission but the Ontario Human Rights Code specifically allowed sexual discrimination in sports. Blainey chose to appeal the Ontario law, and she endured five different court cases before finally having her case heard by the Supreme Court of Canada in 1986. Blainey played for the Toronto Lady Blues women's ice hockey program in the 1990s and assumed another activist role. In 1993, (although the Lady Blues won 13 of the last 15 provincial championships), a task force recommended that the University of Toronto cut the team for financial reasons. Blainey, a member of the team, organized a "Save the Team" night that raised over $8,000. She personally called 100 alumni during a one-week fundraising blitz.

Patrick family
In the fall of 1907, the Patrick Family (consisting of five children, including future Hockey Hall of Fame members Frank and Lester Patrick) relocated to Nelson, British Columbia. By 1910, the Patrick family would influence the Nelson Ladies Hockey Club. Myrtle, Cynda and Dora Patrick were all involved with the club. There were so many members, that the club was split into two teams: the Stirlings and the Wanderers. In 1911, the Nelson Ladies Club was coached by Lester Patrick, and Dora was the captain. Once again, the team would eventually split into two smaller teams: the Cubs and the Athletics. After 1911, the Patrick family left Nelson and moved to Victoria. The Nelson Ladies Club would continue until 1916, but would lose to the Rossland team every year.

Historical games
On February 11, 2000, the Ontario University Athletics women's ice hockey program saw its longest game take place. The University of Toronto's Rhonda Mitchell scored on a 35-foot slap shot. It was the 5:07 mark of the eighth period and the Varsity Blues defeated York University. Although the victory allowed the U of T to advance to the OUA gold medal game, it was the longest in the history of Canadian women's hockey (since broken). The game lasted over five hours and ten minutes. York's player of the game was goaltender Debra Ferguson, as she valiantly made 63 saves over 125 minutes.
March 3, 2011: A postseason match between the Queen's Golden Gaels and the Guelph Gryphons became the longest collegiate hockey game, male or female, Canadian or American — on record. The match began on Wednesday and it only ended on Thursday. The duration of the match was 167 minutes and 14 seconds when Queen's forward Morgan McHaffie placed a rebound past Gryphons goalie Danielle Skoufranis.
On August 26, 2011, 40 women participated in the Longest Ice Hockey Game 4 CF, at Canlan Ice Sports Burnaby 8 Rinks in Burnaby, British Columbia. The goal was to play for the next 10 days as they attempted to set a new Guinness World Record for playing the longest hockey game while also raising funds and awareness for the Canadian Cystic Fibrosis Foundation.

Famous Firsts

 The Abby Hoffman Cup was introduced in 1982 at the first Canadian National Women's Hockey Championship known as the "Shopper's Drug Mart Women's Nationals".
Lesley Reddon was part of the 1994–95 UNB Varsity Reds men's team and became the first female goaltender to play in the Atlantic Universities Hockey Conference.
In 2002, at the age of 16, Shannon Szabados became the first female to play in the Western Hockey League. Szabados played in four exhibition games for the Tri-City Americans. On September 22, 2002, she played 20 seconds of a regular season game.
 November 15, 2003: Kim St. Pierre was the first woman in CIS history to be credited with a win in a men's regular season game. This occurred when the McGill Redmen defeated the Ryerson Rams by a score of 5–2.
Catherine White scored the first goal in the history of the Canadian National Women's Under 18 program (on August 23, 2007, in Ottawa, Ontario).

Timeline of Events
1902: In 1902, a challenge match was held between the Ladies Hockey Clubs of Trois Rivieres and Montreal. At the time, it was hailed as the national championship of Canada as there were no organized leagues or tournaments.
1914: The first provincial championship in Ontario was held in 1914 in Picton. Six teams competed in the event.
March 19, 1990: The 1st Women's World Hockey Championship is played in Ottawa, Ontario, Canada. The European teams came to the event at their own personal expenses. The Canadian team wore pink sweaters and pink socks. TSN and RDS broadcast the game across Canada. The Canadian team beat the United States by a score of 5–2.

Tournaments
The OWHA would lobby for a national championship for women. The first Canadian national women's championship was in 1983 and the first corporate sponsor of the event was Shoppers Drug Mart.
In 1987, Toronto, Ontario hosted the first ever Women's World Championship. Of note, the tournament was not recognized by the International Ice Hockey Federation. The championship trophy was named the Hazel McCallion World Cup, in honor of Mississauga mayor Hazel McCallion.

Banff Winter Carnival
The following is a list of all the champion's from the Banff Winter Carnival. The Banff Winter Carnival organizers were known to pay each team up to twenty-five percent of gate receipts to help cover team expenses. In later years, the Carnival would guarantee travel expenses for the competing teams.

Canada Winter Games

The following were players who participated in the Canada Winter Games women's hockey tournament and would go on to represent Canada in ice hockey at the Winter Olympics

Lipstick tournament
The roots of the Lipstick Tournament can be traced to Wallaceburg resident Grace Small. In early 1966, she requested that arena manager Harold Ribson allow some ice time for teenage girls. Ribson agreed while Gus Lalonde and Doug Myers agreed to coach the local group of teenage girls. After a few games, Ribson arranged a one-day girls tournament, contested on February 27, 1966.

Although this was not the first Lipstick Tourney, eleven women's teams participated. Under Wally Enterprises CEO Jack Lacey, a championship shield was provided for the tournament. The Six Nations girls team won the championship and were declared Ontario champions, as sanctioned by the Ontario Athletic Commission office. Harold Ribson saw the potential of the concept. It was not only an opportunity for female hockey competition but a way to promote the city of Wallaceburg. Ribson (along with Terry Brodeur) selected the Valentine's Day 1967 weekend as the date for the first Lipstick Tournament.

Entries from sixteen teams were accepted and it involved 256 players from Ontario and Michigan. Jean Walker, who had played in the early 20th century, from Chippewa, ON, dropped the puck at the ceremonial face off. Jack Adams, general manager of the NHL's Detroit Red Wings attended, along with retired Detroit Red Wings netminder Johnny Mowers.
In addition, Ribson arranged for the Hockey Night in Canada TV production crew to visit Wallaceburg on Friday night to play an exhibition game with the local Wallaceburg Hornettes women's team. Broadcaster Ward Cornell and Toronto Maple Leafs broadcaster Bill Hewitt attended. TV clips were shown between periods the following night on Hockey Night in Canada. Jack Lacey became involved again as he supplied a set of custom-painted pink-coloured hockey sticks to the Hornettes for use in the tournament. also donated trophies for top scorer, most valuable player and best goaltender.
The Port Huron entry won the inaugural 1967 Lipstick Tournament. The second Lipstick Tourney in 1968 was affected by a devastating flood that hit the community in February. The tourney did continue with 16 entries. Hilda Ranscombe from Preston, a member of the 1935 Preston Rivulettes, Canadian champions was the guest of honour. Marian Coveny, who would later play for Team Canada, made one of several appearances in the tournament. Of note, the 1968 tournament would be the last tourney organized by Harold and Lila Ribson. The Wallaceburg Jaycees came forth and volunteered to convene the following Lipstick Tourney as a fund raiser.

The Lipstick Tourney was on a strong footing with the Jaycees at the helm and by 1975, the tournament grew to 21 teams. Over 4,500 fans total attended games in 1975, as the tournament was tied to other events that involved Wallaceburg's centennial. Mary Lou Atkins, coach of the first Hornettes team, dropped the puck at the ceremonial face off. Wallaceburg did not enter a team every year due to members leaving for further education and marriage. 
By 1978, the new local entry was the Knights of Pythias Hawks. In 1980, 28 teams were accepted into the tourney, resulting in some games competed in Dresden. Teams from as far away as Boston and Edmonton competed in the tournament. In 1985, the local entry was called Vanatters Panthers with Dina Celotto the MVP and Lynn McCreary, top goaltender. The last Lipstick Tourney of the 20th Century was held in 1993. In 2006 a group of local parents led by Lynn Vanderveeken revived the Lipstick Tourney.

Awards

Abby Hoffman Cup
The Abby Hoffman Cup was introduced in 1982 at the first Canadian National Women's Hockey Championship known as the "Shopper's Drug Mart Women's Nationals. The event was held in Brantford, Ontario and the Ontario Women's Hockey Association presented the trophy.

Angela James Bowl
The Angela James Bowl was awarded to the highest scoring player in the now defunct Canadian Women's Hockey League.

Isobel Gathorne Hardy Award

Lady Isobel Gathorne-Hardy's role as a pioneer of women's ice hockey in Canada is acknowledged with the Isobel Gathorne-Hardy Award. The award is given to an active player (at any level) whose values, leadership and personal traits are representative of all female athletes.

Other notable awards
In 1992, Fran Rider won the Gold Stick Award from the Ontario Hockey Association. She was the first woman in forty five years to have the honor bestowed upon her.
Hayley Wickenheiser, 2007 Bobbie Rosenfeld Award
Cassie Campbell, 2007 Canada Sports Hall of Fame Inductee, ''(Campbell becomes the first female hockey player inducted into the Hall)
Geraldine Heaney, 2008 Inductee, International Ice Hockey Federation Hall of Fame
Angela James, 2008 Inductee, International Ice Hockey Federation Hall of Fame
Angela James, on June 22, 2010, it was announced that she will be inducted into the Hockey Hall of Fame.
Cassie Campbell, Order of Hockey in Canada

See also
 History of women's ice hockey in the United States
 U Sports women's ice hockey championship
 Canadian Women's Hockey League (CWHL)
 Western Women's Hockey League (WWHL)
 National Women's Hockey League (1999) (NWHL)
 Clarkson Cup
 History of Canadian sports#Women

References

Sources

History
Ice hockey, women
Women